Shag Rock is a rock 0.1 miles (0.2 km) east of Cliff Island and 8 miles (13 km) west of Prospect Point, off the west coast of Graham Land. Charted and named by the British Graham Land Expedition (BGLE), 1934–37, under Rymill.

Rock formations of Graham Land
Graham Coast